Antoine Louis Raffy (1868 in Laroque-Timbaut, Lot-et-Garonne – died in March 1931 in Nérac) was a French composer of church music and organist.

Biography 

Works

Organ and harmonium 
 L’Orgue, 3 booklets, Paris: Loret fils and H. Freytag, (1899–1901).
 Pieces in [https://www.chapitre.com/BOOK/delepine-h-l-abbe/echos-jubilaires-des-maitres-de-l-orgue-pieces-pour-orgue-ou-harmonium-volume-1,62385994.aspx Échos jubilaires des maîtres de l’orgue], published by abbott Henri Delépine, Procure de musique religieuse (1908 and 1929).
 Pieces in the Archives de l’Organiste, 8 vol. published by H. Delépine, Procure de musique religieuse.
 École d’Orgue, Méthode complète pour harmonium, 2 vol., Saint-Leu-la-Forêt: Procure de musique religieuse (1908).
 Célèbres et Grands Organistes Célèbres et Grands Maîtres Classiques, collection of pieces for organ or harmonium, for the use of the divine service, chosen and annotated by Louis Raffy, 6 vol, Op. 57-62. Arras: Procure générale de musique religieuse (1910–13).
 10 Pieces for organ or harmonium, St-Laurent-sur-Sèvre: L.-J. Biton, (1913).
 200 Versets, préludes, antiennes, etc. dans les tons majeurs et mineurs les plus usités, extraits des œuvres des maîtres anciens, choisis ou transcrits pour l’orgue, Arras: Procure générale de musique religieuse, (1913).
 Pastorale et noël for organ, [s.l.] [s.n.], (1914).
 La Lyre Sacrée, collection of pieces for organ or harmonium, Paris: Procure générale de musique religieuse, s.d.
 Le Service de l’organiste, pièces pratiques pour orgue ou harmonium à l’usage du service divin, in 12 deliveries, 1st delivery (1914).
 Suite pour Orgue Op. 74, St-Laurent-sur-Sèvre: L.-J. Biton, (1914).
 Meditation, for the reed or pipe organ. Extracted from the 2d Series of the Parnassus of the organists for the XXth century, Hythe (Kent): the Organ Music Publishing Office (1914).
 Reflets de vitraux, Op. 81. Pieces for organ or harmonium, 2 vol. Paris: Procure générale (1930).

Piano 
 Dans le vague, elegy for piano, Paris: Loret fils et H. Freylag, (1896).
 Fleurette ! suite of waltzes for piano, Paris: Loret fils and H. Freylag, (1896).
 Gitanilla, bohemian dance for piano, Arras: Société d’éditions modernes, (1912).
 Sorrentina, tarentelle for piano, Arras: Société d’éditions modernes, (1912).

References

External links 
 L’orgue de St-Nicolas
 Offertoire solennel ou Sortie - Louis Raffy (1868-1932)
 
 Offertoire solennel de Louis Raffy on YouTube

1868 births
1931 deaths
People from Lot-et-Garonne
French composers of sacred music
French classical organists
French male organists
Male classical organists